The Ostracon of Senemut is an ancient Egyptian limestone ostracon which dates from the reign of Hatshepsut (1479 BC – 1458 BC), in the 18th Dynasty.

Design
The ostracon portrays Senemut, a courtier of Hatshepsut.

It is a figured-ostracon, of portrait type with heads only. The ceramic is made of white limestone, with dimensions of approximately 3 in (0.8 dm) by 7 in (1.8 dm).

The Ostracon of Senemut is currently part of the collection at the Metropolitan Museum of Art.

Traditionally, ostraca in Egypt were used for artist's sketchings, cartoons-caricatures, letter documents, school–practice writing, and graffiti.

Ostraca depicting Senenmut

See also
Djehuty, the god Thoth

References

External links

Picture of Ostracon of Senemut and Djehuty. 
Article discussion
Metropolitan Museum of Art: official site

15th-century BC works
Ostracon
Drawings of the Metropolitan Museum of Art
Art of ancient Egypt
Hatshepsut